Sebastien Grainger & The Mountains is the debut solo album by Sebastien Grainger. The album was originally released in 2008.

Track listing

"Love Can Be So Mean" – 3:26
"Who Do We Care For?" – 2:28
"By Cover of Night (Fire Fight)" – 3:47
"I'm All Rage (Live '05)" – 4:12
"I Hate My Friends" – 4:32
"(Are There) Ways to Come Home?" – 4:03
"Niagara" – 1:28
"(I Am Like A) River" – 4:30
"Love Is Not a Contest"  – 2:38
"American Names" – 4:12
"Meet New Friends" – 5:13
"Renegade Silence" (feat. The Rhythm Method) – 3:38

Personnel
Sebastien Grainger
Nick Sewell
Leon Taheny
Andrew Scott

Sebastien Grainger albums
2008 albums